Mohammad Waqas (born 15 May 1987) is a Pakistani first-class cricketer who plays for Karachi.

References

External links
 

1987 births
Living people
Pakistani cricketers
Karachi cricketers
Pakistan Television cricketers
Cricketers from Hyderabad, Sindh
Hyderabad (Pakistan) cricketers